Thomas Kremer (26 May 1930 – 24 June 2017) was a game inventor and marketer who acquired the rights to market the Rubik's Cube.

Tom Kremer was a games designer, entrepreneur and publisher, best known for his discovery and popularisation of the Rubik's Cube. As an octogenarian he founded the publishing house Notting Hill Editions, with the aim of reinvigorating the lost art of the essay.

Biography
Kremer was born in Transylvania (Székelyföld) in 1930, the son of Bundy Kremer an army officer and Lilly(Heller) Kremer. As a teenager he was imprisoned at the Bergen-Belsen concentration camp, he was freed upon its liberation in April 1945. Travelling to Israel he joined the fight for the fledgling country's independence, gained in 1948. Following studies in philosophy at Edinburgh University, where he met his wife-to-be, he carried out post-graduate research at the Sorbonne.

Kremer had been living in England and working in games design since the 1960s when he visited a trade show in Germany and saw the Rubik's Cube for the first time in 1979. His son David recalled: "The cube wasn't a big sensation at the Nuremberg toy fair: it was just a small thing in a backwater section at this huge event." Kremer licensed the design to the Ideal Toy Company, which by 1983 had already sold some 300m of the fiendishly complicated 3D puzzle. The Cube's worldwide success came, he said, because it "challenges you with simplicity. You can handle it, and yet it has enormous hidden complexity." But it also became a victim of its own success, as his son explained: "Everybody had one. The cube went from world's greatest fad to zero: there were thousands piled up in warehouses."  Kremer later reacquired the license, allowing him to introduce it to new generations of puzzlers.

Kremer was a cofounder of Winning Moves Games and later chairman of the board, while cofounder Phil Orbanes served as president.  It was while serving at Winning Moves that Kremer was able to reacquire the Rubik's Cube in 2000.
Kremer was married to Lady Alison Emily Kremer daughter of Robert Balfour, 3rd Earl of Balfour

References

External links

1930 births
2017 deaths
People from Transylvania
Romanian emigrants to the United Kingdom
Romanian publishers (people)
Rubik's Cube
Romanian Jews
Bergen-Belsen concentration camp survivors
Alumni of the University of Edinburgh